Terry Hayes (born 8 October 1951) is an English-born Australian screenwriter, producer and author best known for his work with the Kennedy Miller film production house and his debut novel I Am Pilgrim.

Biography
Born in Sussex, England, Hayes moved to Australia at the age of 5.  He began his career as a journalist, working as the US correspondent for the Australian newspaper The Sydney Morning Herald.

Family
Terry was married in 1999 and has one son Connor.

Kennedy Miller
After periods spent as an investigative reporter, columnist and radio show host, Hayes met director George Miller when he did the novelisation of the script to Mad Max (1979). He and Miller got on well and the director subsequently hired Hayes to help on the script for Mad Max 2 (1981).

Hayes subsequently became an in-house writer for Kennedy Miller, working on the scripts for all their subsequent mini-series. Further work included a script for Dead Calm in 1989. He wrote Bangkok Hilton specifically as a vehicle for Nicole Kidman.

Hollywood
Hayes moved to Hollywood. His work includes an unused screenplay for Planet of the Apes, titled Return of the Apes in 1994.

In 2001, Hayes was nominated for the Bram Stoker Award for Best Screenplay for his work on From Hell.

Hayes' debut novel, I Am Pilgrim was published by Transworld Publishers on 18 July 2013. That same month, Metro-Goldwyn-Mayer acquired the film rights to the novel with Hayes attached to adapt it into a screenplay. His second novel entitled The Year of the Locust was planned for release in 2016, but has yet to be released. It is intended to be released on the 30th March 2023.

Filmography

Television
The Dismissal (1983) (TV mini-series)
Bodyline (1984) (TV mini-series)
The Cowra Breakout (1984) (TV mini-series) - producer only
Vietnam (1987) (TV mini-series) - also producer
Dirtwater Dynasty (1988) (TV mini-series) - also producer
Bangkok Hilton (1989) (TV mini-series) - also producer

Novels
I Am Pilgrim (2013)
The Year of the Locust (TBD)

References

External links

Living people
English screenwriters
English male screenwriters
English film producers
1951 births